The Ovsiankina effect is the tendency to pick up an interrupted action again when it has still not been achieved. It is named after its researcher, Maria Ovsiankina.

The effect states that an interrupted task, even without incentive, values as a "quasi-need". It creates intrusive thoughts, aimed at taking up the task again and possibly resulting into cognitive dissonance.

This can be explained by Kurt Lewin's field theory, which points that an interrupted action is a condition for a strained system. It also leads to a better remembering of the unfinished action over a vacant one (Zeigarnik effect).

See also 
 Human multitasking
 Rumination (psychology)

References 

Psychological effects